Shooting sports in Canada are practised across the country at recreational and competitive levels, including internationally and at the Olympics. Each province has its own organizations that govern the various disciplines. Many of the disciplines are connected nationally and some are part of larger international organizations.

History of shooting sports in Canada

National shooting organizations

The Canadian Shooting Sports Association and the National Firearms Association are Canada's main firearm advocacy associations. They work at the national level to promote and protect the shooting sports. These organizations were created in reaction to increasing laws and regulations governing ownership and use of firearms in Canadian society. They are independent of one another, but share the common goals of promoting firearm culture, education, and safety.

Canadian Shooting Sports Association
The Canadian Shooting Sports Association (CSSA) was formed by the merger of the Ontario Handgun Association (OHA) and the Ontario Smallbore Federation (OSF). The CSSA is a national organization with representation and membership in every province and claims over 30,000 members. The CSSA supports, promotes, and sponsors all shooting sports and is politically active at the provincial and federal levels of government.

National Firearms Association

The National Firearms Association (NFA) is a non-profit dedicated to the promotion of marksmanship and firearm safety and the protection of rights related to hunting, self-defence, and property rights. They operate at the national level to ensure shooting sports and related activities. The NFA also provides legal information and assistance concerning firearm and property rights legislation. They publish the Canadian Firearms Journal.

Dominion of Canada Rifle Association

The Dominion of Canada Rifle Association (DCRA) is the national governing body for fullbore target shooting. The Association promotes and supports the pursuit of excellence in military and civilian marksmanship as a positive and significant contribution to Canada, to shooting sports and the safe handling of firearms. DCRA is affiliated to the International Confederation of Fullbore Rifle Associations and sends teams to World Championships every four years. As of 2022, DCRA teams had won the Palma Trophy four times for Canada - in 1901; 1967; 1972 and 1982.

Shooting Federation of Canada
The Shooting Federation of Canada (SFC) ((FTC)) is the national sport organization for target shooting sports in Canada. The SFC is responsible for the promotion, development and governing of organized, recreational and competitive target shooting in Canada. It is part of the Canadian Olympic Committee and represents Canada within the International Shooting Sport Federation.
The SFC began in 1932 as the Canadian Small Bore Rifle Association.  After the Second World War, the CSBA changed its name to the Canadian Civilian Association of Marksmen. It used this name until December 2, 1964. Since then it has been known as The Shooting Federation of Canada. The SFC issues multiple awards every year to Canadian athletes that distinguish themselves in their shooting sport. The SFC similarly hosts the annual National Championships for the disciplines falling under pistol, rifle, skeet and trap shooting.

Canadian University Shooting Federation 
The Canadian University Shooting Federation (CUSF) is a national non-profit organization established in January 2018, which promotes amateur sport shooting for post-secondary students in Canada.

Programs include Smallbore Rifle, Trap and Skeet. To administer these leagues the CUSF works with sporting organizations such as the SFC, NSSA, and ATA, among others. In 2020 there was 19 affiliated clubs at schools across Canada. The organization is apolitical, open to all, and promotes safe and responsible firearms use.

The Canadian University Shooting Federation has an active application for Registered Canadian Amateur Athletic Association (RCAAA) charitable status.

International Practical Shooting Confederation Canada 
The International Practical Shooting Confederation Canada (IPSC Canada) is the Canadian affiliate of the International Practical Shooting Confederation.

References

External links
Alberta Provincial Rifle Association
Shooting Federation de Tir Canada